Cërrik is a municipality in Elbasan County, central Albania. The municipality consists of the administrative units of Gostimë, Klos, Mollas, Shalës with Cërrik constituting its seat. As of the Institute of Statistics estimate from the 2011 census, there were 6,695 people residing in Cërrik and 27,445 in Cërrik Municipality.

Geography 

Cërrik is located between the Shkumbin River and Devoll River in central Albania.

Economy 

Cërrik developed around an oil refinery plant that was being constructed in 1952 and started operations on 8 November 1956. In 1957, after the crude oil processing capacity increased to 800 tons per 24 hours. In 1961, the plant was reconstructed, increasing its processing capacity to 1500 tons per 24 hours. The plant started to produce lubricating oils for engines and mechanical parts such as the avtol 18 and DP 14 vehicles and type TS1 kerosene for airplanes. In 1965 the production of naphthalene soap and Naphthalic acid began. Today the Plant is not functional. But there is agricultural happening and there is a State radio station known as the Radio Stacioni Kombetar Shtermen. The city has had many opportunities for a better economy for its people and land.

Sports 

The city main plays football and its home team is KS Turbina Cërrik. The club was formed in 1956 and its home stadium is Nexhip Trungu Stadium with a capacity of 6,600 spectators. The team plays in the Albanian First Division and it is in group B.

Notable people 
Alban Hoxha
Armando Sadiku
Rajmonda Bulku

Notes

References

External links 

bashkiacerrik.gov.al – Official Website 

 
Administrative units of Cërrik
Municipalities in Elbasan County
Towns in Albania